Hans Biørn Wenneberg (17 September 1804-28 May 1878) was a Norwegian politician.

He was born in Kragerø in Telemark where he later  worked as a merchant and ship-owner. In 1855 and 1857 he was the mayor of Kragerø. He was elected to the Parliament of Norway in 1848, 1851 and 1854, representing the constituency of Kragerø.

References

1804 births
1878 deaths
Norwegian merchants
Norwegian businesspeople in shipping
Members of the Storting
Politicians from Telemark
People from Kragerø
19th-century Norwegian businesspeople